Ghulam Muhammad Maneka (died 2012) was a Pakistani politician who was Member of National Assembly of Pakistan and former federal minister during Benazir Bhutto cabinet.

Family
His son Ahmad Raza Maneka is currently member of the National Assembly of Pakistan.

References

2012 deaths
Federal ministers of Pakistan
Ghulam